Exaeretia daurella is a moth in the family Depressariidae. It was described by Alexandr L. Lvovsky in 1998. It is found in Transbaikalia.

References

Moths described in 1998
Exaeretia
Moths of Asia